James Michael Brundle (born 15 December 1986, in King's Lynn, England) is a former motorcycle speedway rider from England.

Career
Brundle began his career with King's Lynn Stars in the Conference League in 2002. He moved up to the King's Lynn Premier League team in 2003 and spent a season on loan with Mildenhall Fen Tigers when they moved up to the Premier League in 2006. In 2007 he won the Premier Trophy with the King's Lynn Stars and in 2008 he won the Elite League KO Cup with Eastbourne Eagles.

References 

1986 births
Living people
British speedway riders
English motorcycle racers
King's Lynn Stars riders
Mildenhall Fen Tigers riders
Eastbourne Eagles riders
Sportspeople from King's Lynn